This list of synagogues in Croatia contains active, otherwise used and destroyed synagogues in Croatia. The list of Croatia synagogues is not necessarily complete, as only a negligible number of sources testify to the existence of some synagogues.

Sources 
 

Croatia
Croatia
Synagogues